Krystina Arielle (born 1986) is an American actor and cosplayer. She is known for her work in several RPG web series and is the host of Star Wars: The High Republic Show.

Originally from Georgia, Arielle is currently based in Los Angeles, California.

Filmography
The Candlenights 2020 Special (2020)
Fungeons & Flagons (Web series) (2019) 
Into the Mother Lands RPG (Web series) (2020)
Denver by Night (Web series) (2020)
Library Bards: DnD (Short) (2020)
Ex Roommate (Short) (2019)
Star Trek Adventures - Forests of the Night (Web series) (2019)
Adventuring Academy (Podcast) (2019)
Critical Role (Web series) (2018)
Stream of Many Eyes (2018) (TV short)
Dimension 20: Pirates of Leviathan (Web series) (2020)

References

American television hosts
American women television presenters
21st-century American actresses
Living people
1986 births